The Leonard Law is a California law passed in 1992 and amended in 2006 that applies the First Amendment of the United States Constitution to private and public colleges, high schools, and universities. The law also applies Article I, Section 2 of the California Constitution to colleges and universities. California is the only state to grant First Amendment protections to students at private postsecondary institutions. Attempts at a federal Leonard Law and for Leonard Laws in other states have not succeeded.

About
Republican State Senator Bill Leonard wrote the law to require private high schools, colleges, and universities to protect their students' rights to freedom of speech "and other communication" that the government is required to protect for all of its citizens. Under the terms of the law, students may file civil lawsuits to seek injunctive and declaratory relief against their institutions; students may also recover any attorney's fees related to the case.

In 2006, California amended the law to include public institutions of higher education, which in California consist of the California Community Colleges System, the California State University system, and the University of California system. State Assembly members Leland Yee and Joe Nation authored the amendment in preemptive response to the Hosty v. Carter decision of the federal Seventh Circuit Court of Appeals. The amendment came into force in 2007.

Lawsuits
On May 2, 1994, Stanford Law School student Robert J. Corry and eight other Stanford University students filed the first lawsuit under the Leonard Law, claiming that Stanford's speech code violated the law. On February 27, 1995, Santa Clara County Superior Court Judge Peter G. Stone issued the ruling in Corry v. Stanford that struck down the speech code as a violation of the Leonard Law.

See also
California Education Code 48907
Student newspaper
Student rights
Student activism
Student Press Law Center
First Amendment Center

References

External links
California Education Code § 94367 (Leonard Law)
Calif. Educ. Code Section 66301 (2006 Leonard Law) at the Student Press Law Center
Article I of the California Constitution
Text of Decision in Corry v. Stanford

California statutes
1992 in California
1992 in law
2006 in California
2006 in American law
First Amendment to the United States Constitution
Freedom of expression law
Higher education law